Agnieszka Arnold (born 24 September 1947 in Łowicz) is a Polish documentary filmmaker born 1947. She compiled two documentaries on the Jedwabne pogrom of Jewish villagers, during World War II, by their Polish neighbors.

Films

 Miś (1980) - Assistant director
 Kto ziarno nadziei siał (1993)
 Anoszim, noszim, we-taf... (1993)
 Mit, tradycja, rzeczywistość (1994)
 Miasteczko (1995)
 Oberek (1996)
 Ocalona (1996)
 Bareizm (1997)
 Na początku była Trzcinica (1997)
 ...Gdzie mój starszy syn Kain (1999)
 Ikona Bożego Narodzenia (2000)
 Czarny lipiec (2001)
 Sąsiedzi (2001)
 Bohater (2002) - on Romuald Rajs
 Historia matematyka polski (2003)
 Oczyszczenie (2003)
 Przebaczenie (2003)
 Polak z Żytomierza (2004)
 Lider (2005)
 Zula z Czeczenii (2005)
 Bunt Janion (2006)
 Niepodległość bez cenzury (2006)

External links

"Movie on WWII Jewish Massacre Shocks Poles 
Premiere Screening of Arnold's Rotem

1947 births
Living people
People from Łowicz
Polish Lutherans
Polish women journalists
20th-century Polish journalists
21st-century Polish journalists
20th-century Polish women